Helianthus giganteus, the giant sunflower or tall sunflower, is a species of Helianthus native to the eastern United States and eastern and central Canada, from Newfoundland west to Alberta south to Minnesota, Mississippi, and South Carolina.

Description
The leaves are slender and lanceolate. They are most commonly found in valleys with wet meadows or swamps and even near river banks.

References

giganteus
Flora of Ontario
Flora of North America
Plants described in 1753
Taxa named by Carl Linnaeus